is the debut single of Japanese girl group Melon Kinenbi. It was used as the ending theme of the TBS show "Majutsu-shi Ōfen Revenge". Its highest position on the Oricon weekly chart was #60.

Track listings

CD

External links
Amai Anata no Aji at the Up-Front Works release list (Zetima) (Japanese)

2000 singles
Zetima Records singles
Song recordings produced by Tsunku
Songs written by Tsunku
2000 songs